The 2018 season was Hammarby Fotboll's 103st in existence, their 49th season in Allsvenskan and their 4th consecutive season in the league. They competed in Allsvenskan and Svenska Cupen during the year. League play started in early April and lasted until early November. Stefan Billborn made his first season as manager.

Summary
In the off-season, on 4 January 2018, the board and Jesper Jansson, director of football, chose to sack manager Jakob Michelsen, citing differences regarding the view on transfers and playing style, as well as a disappointing development of the team and its results. Hammarby finished 9th in Allsvenskan 2017.

Players

Squad information

Transfers

In

Out

Player statistics

Appearances and goals

Disciplinary record

Club

Coaching staff

Other information

Pre-season and friendlies

Friendlies

Competitions

Allsvenskan

League table

Results summary

Results by round

Matches
Kickoff times are in (UTC+01) unless stated otherwise.

Svenska Cupen

2017–18
The tournament continued from the 2017 season.

Kickoff times are in UTC+1.

Group stage

2018–19
The tournament continues into the 2019 season.

Qualification stage

Footnotes

References

Hammarby Fotboll seasons
Hammarby Fotboll